Sesvete can refer to one of the following:

 Sesvete, a district of the City of Zagreb, Croatia
 Sesvete, Požega-Slavonia County, a village near Požega, Croatia
 Podravske Sesvete, a village and a municipality in Podravina, Croatia